3G: A Killer Connection is a 2013 Indian Hindi-language horror thriller film directed by Sheershak Anand and Shantanu Ray Chhibber, and produced under Eros International and Next Gen Films. The film features Neil Nitin Mukesh and Sonal Chauhan in lead roles. It was released in India on 15 March 2013.

Premise
Sam buys a 3G enabled phone while holidaying in the Fiji Islands with Sheena. Unforeseen events take place after he starts receiving unknown calls and finds his life at risk.

Cast
 Neil Nitin Mukesh as Sameer "Sam" Arora
 Sonal Chauhan as Sheena
 Mrinalini Sharma as Chaima
 Asheesh Kapur as Mong Hayward
 Shantanu Ray Chibber as Father Patterson

Critical reception
3G has received mixed to negative response from critics. Ankur Pathak from Rediff.com rated the film 1.5/5 stars and says "Watch 3G only for a few cheap thrills." Swati Deogire of in.com gave the movie 2.5 stars, saying "3G is strictly OK and is more of a travel brochure for Fiji." Taran Adarsh from Bollywood Hungama rated the film 2/5 and added "3G doesn't work despite potential in its premise".

Soundtrack
The soundtrack of the film is composed by Mithoon and lyrics are penned by Mithoon, Shellee, Sonu Kakkar . A single track called "Kaise Bataaoon" which is sung by KK & Sonal Chauhan was released on 15 February 2013. Arijit Singh also sang in the movie. Musicperk.com rated the album 7.5/10

Track listing

References

External links 
 

Hindi-language horror films
Indian horror thriller films
2013 horror thriller films
Films shot in Fiji
2013 films
2010s Hindi-language films